In operator algebras, an algebra is said to be approximately finite-dimensional if it contains an increasing sequence of finite-dimensional subalgebras that is dense. One can consider

Approximately finite dimensional C*-algebras, or
Approximately finite-dimensional von Neumann algebras.

C*-algebras
Von Neumann algebras